Huff is a surname. Notable people with the surname include:

 Aquilla Huff (born 1779), American who founded Huff Township in Spencer County, Indiana
 Aubrey Huff (born 1976), American baseball player
 Bob Huff (born 1953), American politician
 Brent Huff (born 1961), American actor, writer and film director
 Bryce Huff (born 1997), American football player
Daniel W. Huff (1854–1940), American politician
 Dann Huff (born 1960), singer, guitarist, songwriter and producer, and foundation member of 80s hard rock band Giant
 Darrell Huff (1913–2001), economist and author of How to Lie with Statistics
 David Huff (musician), drummer (born 1961), songwriter and record producer, and foundation member of Giant along with brother Dann
 David Huff (baseball) (born 1984), baseball player
 Douglas Huff (1931–1988), American politician
 Gail Huff, reporter for Boston's WCBV-TV, and wife of U.S. Senator Scott Brown
 Gene Huff (1929–2011), American politician
 George Huff (coach) (1872–1936), American athlete and coach; manager of the Boston Red Sox
 George Huff (singer) (born 1980), American singer
 Janice Huff (born 1960), meteorologist and TV anchor person
 Jay Huff (born 1998), American basketball player
 Josh Huff (born 1991), American football player
 Leon Huff (born 1942), Afro-American songwriter and record producer with Kenneth Gamble as Gamble and Huff
 Michael Huff (born 1983), American football player
 Nicole Huff (born 1998), Canadian actress
 Orlando Huff (born 1978), American football player
 Paul B. Huff (1918–1994), Medal of Honor recipient
 Sam Huff aka Robert Lee Huff (1934–2021), American football player, coach and commentator
 Sam Huff (baseball) (born 1998), American baseball player
 Tanya Huff (born 1957), Canadian fantasy author
 Tom Huff (American politician), American state legislator
 Warren D. Huff, professor of geology at the University of Cincinnati

See also 

 DeHuff